The 1987–88 Honduran Liga Nacional season was the 22nd edition of the Honduran Liga Nacional.  The format of the tournament consisted of two groups of five followed by a 5-team playoff round.  Club Deportivo Olimpia won the title after defeating C.D. Marathón in the finals.  Both teams qualified to the 1988 CONCACAF Champions' Cup.

1987–88 teams

 E.A.C.I. (Isletas)
 Marathón (San Pedro Sula)
 Motagua (Tegucigalpa)
 Olimpia (Tegucigalpa)
 Platense (Puerto Cortés)
 Real España (San Pedro Sula)
 Sula (La Lima)
 Universidad (Tegucigalpa, promoted)
 Victoria (La Ceiba)
 Vida (La Ceiba)

 Platense played its home games at Estadio Francisco Morazán due to renovations to Estadio Excélsior.
 E.A.C.I. is from Isletas but played in Olanchito.

Regular season

Standings Group A

Standings Group B

2nd Place playoff

Final round

Pentagonal standings

Final

 Olimpia won 1–0 on aggregate.

Top scorer
  Gilberto Leonel Machado (Marathón) with 19 goals

Squads

Known results

Round 1

Round 2

Third place playoff

Pentagonal

Unknown rounds

References

Liga Nacional de Fútbol Profesional de Honduras seasons
1987–88 in Honduran football
Honduras